Beware Your Neighbour is a 1951 detective novel by the British writer Cecil Street, writing under the pen name of Miles Burton. It was part of a lengthy series of books featuring the detective Desmond Merrion and Inspector Arnold of Scotland Yard. Unlike much of the series it takes place in suburban rather than rural England. Reviewing the novel in The Spectator Esther Howard wrote " I always find that Mr. Burton  has nearly the most colourless detectives, prose-style and plots of anyone in the business, and Beware Your Neighbour, death in an exclusive thoroughfare, though mechanically adequate, is entirely devoid of excitement."

Synopsis
In the small prosperous street of Hallows Green a series of threatening letters are sent that appear to be leading up to a murder. Desmond Merrion is a friend of one of the residents and lends his assistance. When a murder is committed Arnold of the Yard arrives and they join forces to crack the case.

References

Bibliography
 Evans, Curtis. Masters of the "Humdrum" Mystery: Cecil John Charles Street, Freeman Wills Crofts, Alfred Walter Stewart and the British Detective Novel, 1920-1961. McFarland, 2014.
 Herbert, Rosemary. Whodunit?: A Who's Who in Crime & Mystery Writing. Oxford University Press, 2003.
 Reilly, John M. Twentieth Century Crime & Mystery Writers. Springer, 2015.

1951 British novels
Novels by Cecil Street
British mystery novels
British detective novels
Collins Crime Club books
Novels set in England